The David Sassoon Library and Reading Room is a famous library and heritage structure in Mumbai, India. The idea for a library to be situated in the center of the city came from Albert Sassoon, son of the famous Baghdadi Jewish philanthropist, David Sassoon. The building was designed by architects J. Campbell and G. E. Gosling, for the Scott McClelland and Company, at a cost of Rs. 125,000. David Sassoon donated Rs. 60,000, while the rest of the cost was borne by the Government of Bombay Presidency.
The library is located on Rampart Row, looking across the Kala Ghoda. The building, completed in 1870, is built using yellow Malad stone, much like the abutting Elphinstone College, Army and Navy Buildings and Watson's Hotel. Above the entrance portico is a white stone bust of David Sassoon.  This marble bust was Thomas Woolner's working model for the statue of Sassoon standing at the front of the stairs of the David Sassoon Library.  This standing marble statue, completed in 1865, was commissioned by Sir Bartle Frere, Governor of Bombay and personal friend of the sculptor, Woolner.  Subscriptions came from the Jewish community, a myriad of traders, and friends in England.

The building also houses the Lund and Blockley opticians.

History
The European employees working in the Government Mint and the Dockyard in Mumbai started the Mechanics' Institution in 1847 to provide technical education to adults and to hold lectures. They worked out of rented premises until they moved to their own building thanks to the generosity of Sir David Sassoon. The building was called the David Sassoon Library and Reading Room.

See also
 Sassoon Docks

References

External links

 David Sassoon Library and Reading Room - official website

Library buildings completed in 1870
The Victorian and Art Deco Ensemble of Mumbai
Libraries in Mumbai
1870 establishments in India
Libraries established in 1870